The Bow Mistress Trophy is a Tasmanian Racing Club Group 3 Thoroughbred horse race held under Weight for age conditions, for fillies and mares aged three years old and upwards, over a distance of 1,200 metres at the Tattersall's Park, Glenorchy, Australia in February. The prize money for the event is A$150,000.

History
The race is named after the Tasmanian mare Bow Mistress, who won the 1984 TRC One Thousand Guineas and 1984 VATC Group 2 J J Liston Stakes. The mare was placed in several other graded races on the mainland and is considered one of Tasmania's best racehorses.
The race is usually held on the same day as the Listed Tasmanian Derby.

Grade
2006–2011 - Listed Race
2012 onwards - Group 3

Winners

2023 - Belsielle
2022 - Zoushine
2021 - Ethical Solution
2020 - Zargos
2019 - Life On The Wire
2018 - Gogo Grace
2017 - Ocean Embers
2016 - Nautical
2015 - I Love It
2014 - Isibaeva
2013 - Rebel Bride
2012 - Rebel Bride
 2011 - Lady Lynette
 2010 - Dollops
 2009 - Flying Ruby
 2008 - Diamond Cove
 2007 - Oceano
 2006 - Con's Amy

See also
 List of Australian Group races
 Group races

References

Horse races in Australia
Sprint category horse races for fillies and mares
Sport in Hobart
Recurring sporting events established in 2006
2006 establishments in Australia